Streptomyces canalis is a bacterium species from the genus of Streptomyces which has been isolated from an alkali-removing canal in Xinjiang in China.

See also 
 List of Streptomyces species

References

External links
Type strain of Streptomyces canalis at BacDive -  the Bacterial Diversity Metadatabase

 

canalis
Bacteria described in 2016